Pierre-Joseph (also Pierre Joseph) is a given name and can refer to:

Pierre-Joseph  Alary, (1689–1770), French ecclesiastic and writer
Pierre-Joseph  Amoreux (1741–1824) French physician and naturalist
Pierre  Joseph Bonnaterre (1752–1804), French naturalist
Pierre-Joseph Bourcet (1700–1780), French tactician, general, chief of staff, mapmaker and military educator
Pierre-Joseph  Cambon, (1756–1820), French statesman
Arthur Cardin (1879–1946), Canadian politician 
Pierre-Joseph-Olivier Chauveau (1820–1890), first Premier of the Canadian province of Quebec 
Pierre-Joseph  Thoulier d'Olivet (1682–1768), French abbot, writer, grammarian and French translator
Pigneau de Behaine (1741–1799), French Catholic priest, helped establish Vietnamese Nguyễn Dynasty after Tây Sơn rebellion
Pierre  Joseph Céloron de Blainville (1693–1759), French Canadian Officer of Marine
Pierre-Joseph  Desault, (1738–1795), French anatomist and surgeon
Pierre Macquer (1718–1784), French chemist
Pierre  Joseph Pelletier (1788–1842), French chemist 
Pierre-Joseph  Proudhon (1809–1865), French politician, mutualist philosopher and socialist
Pierre-Joseph  Redouté (1759–1840), Belgian painter and botanist
Amédée Tremblay (1876–1949), Canadian organist, composer, and music educator
Pierre-Joseph  van Beneden (1809–1894), Belgian zoologist and paleontologist

See also
Pierre-Joseph-Marie Chaumonot (1611–1693) French-Canadian Catholic missionary
Pierre-Joseph-Guillaume Zimmermann (1785–1853), French pianist, composer, and music teacher
Pierre-Joseph-Justin Bernard (1708–1775), French military man and salon poet